Marabella is a former town in southern Trinidad, between San Fernando (to the south) and Pointe-à-Pierre (to the north).  Early 19th-century maps highlighted it as Marabella Junction because of the railway intersection to Williamsville and other central areas. Originally a separate town, it was incorporated into the City of San Fernando in the 1990s.

Marabella was home to the Union Park Turf Club (a horse racing venue) later converted to the Manny Ramjohn Stadium, one of the five major stadiums in Trinidad and Tobago, the others being the Ato Boldon, Larry Gomes, Hasley Crawford and the Dwight Yorke Stadium.

Nicknamed "The City that Never Sleeps," the city is always active, as its nightlife of food vending and bars goes almost 24/7. Marabella provides a melting-pot for the wide ethnic groups to "lime" and "ole talk".

Marabella's location near the Solomon Hochoy highway and Southern Main Road makes accessibility to all parts of Trinidad easy. This accessibility combined with its commercial infrastructure makes Marabella a prime residential area. Today it is referred to as the "Commercial Hub of Southern Trinidad".

Marabella, like many other middle-class neighbourhoods in Trinidad, does have a contingent of its population living below the poverty line in areas such as Bay Road and "The Old Train Line".  Marabella is also known for its highly skilled sports personnel, among whom are Raphick Jumadeen (West Indies cricketer), Lloyd John (cyclist), Patricia Cheryl Dyette, Horace Tuitt (track and field), Richard Quanchan (national footballer and hockey player), Don Smith, Fitzroy Guiseppi, Roy Harry, and Johnny DePeiza (boxers). It was home to several steel orchestras such as Southern Marines, Scarlet Symphony, Joylanders, Avalons and Combos such as Ancil Wyatt, Magnets, Silhouettes, Jerry Stewart and Psychedelic Sounds.

Marabella is also boasts celebrity entertainers, including Jemel the Entertainer and DJ Floops

References

San Fernando, Trinidad and Tobago
Neighbourhoods in Trinidad and Tobago